Nazimuddin Alam is a Bangladesh Nationalist Party politician and the former Member of Parliament from Bhola-4.

Career
Alam was elected to Parliament in 2001 from Bhola-4 as a candidate of Bangladesh Nationalist Party. He was charged with the attempted murder of Akhtarul Alam, a Bangladesh Jubo League who was attacked on 16 January 2004. The case was filled on 11 March 2007 against Alam and an arrest warrant was issued against him on 5 April 2008. He is a member of the executive committee of the Bangladesh Nationalist Party. He was arrested on 2 February 2018 by Bangladesh Police for vandalism in the Bangladesh Supreme Court premises.

References

Bangladesh Nationalist Party politicians
Living people
8th Jatiya Sangsad members
Year of birth missing (living people)
6th Jatiya Sangsad members
7th Jatiya Sangsad members